Grey coat, Greycoat, Graycoat, or Grey Coat may refer to:

 Grey (coat colour) of horses
 Grey Coat School, York, girls' school in York
 Grey Coat Hospital, girls' school in Westminster, London
 Greycoats (band), indie rock group from Minneapolis, Minnesota
 Confederate States Army soldier, nickname based on:
 Uniforms of the Confederate States military forces, mostly had gray coats

See also
 "Graycoat Soldiers" track on The Fields of November, 1974 album by Norman Blake